Toto in Hell is a 1955 Italian fantasy-comedy film directed by Camillo Mastrocinque. Italian cult horror film director Lucio Fulci co-wrote the screenplay.

Plot 
Antonio Marchi, a depressed thief, after several attempts of suicide, accidentally drowns in a river and ends up in hell. Here he is recognized as a reincarnation of Mark Antony and instead of ending the group of Violents is thrown by Belfegor to Cleopatra's arms, in the Lussuriosi group. But the meeting between the two is frowned upon by Satan, who is jealous of the woman, so, Totò, to escape his anger, escapes back to Earth.

Cast 

Totò as  Antonio Marchi
Maria Frau as  Cleopatra
Olga Solbelli as  Cleopatra's mother
Tino Buazzelli as  Devil-secretary
Nerio Bernardi as  Satana
Dante Maggio as  Pacifico
Mario Castellani as  Cri cri / Jealous husband  
Fulvia Franco as  Dirimpettaia
Franca Faldini as  Maria
Galeazzo Benti as  Club Singer
Giulio Calì as  Charon 
Vincent Barbi as  Al Capone
Mario Pisu as  Ptolemy
Pietro Tordi as  The fool
Guglielmo Inglese as  Cavaliere Scardacchione
Ignazio Balsamo as Infermiere
Aldo Giuffrè as Minosse

References

External links

1955 films
Films directed by Camillo Mastrocinque
Italian comedy films
1950s fantasy comedy films
1955 comedy films
Italian black-and-white films
1950s Italian films